Leonid Vladimirovich Sherwood ( (28 April 1871 – 28 August 1954) was a Russian sculptor and architect.

Biography

Sherwood was born in Moscow. He was of English descent, his grandfather Joseph Sherwood having been an English engineer who emigrated to Russia. His father was the architect Vladimir Osipovich Sherwood and his brother was the architect Vladimir Vladimirovich Sherwood. His surname is often transliterated as Shervud.

Leonid Shervud was responsible for the magnificent memorial to Admiral Stepan Makarov, killed at the battle of Tsushima during the Russo-Japanese war, erected in 1913 on Yakornaya Ploshchad ("Anchor Square") in front of the Naval Cathedral of St. Nicolas in Kronshtadt, the headquarters of the Russian Imperial Navy. Sherwood chose to use as the pedestal a 160-ton granite rock originally cut for a monument to Peter the Great in front of Kazan Cathedral, which sunk in transit to St. Petersburg. The bottom of the rock is engraved with the words: "Remember the War", which was Admiral Makarov's personal motto.

Sherwood was one of the first sculptors to be involved in monumental Soviet sculpture after the revolution and was responsible for many official busts and monumental statues. He was also the architect of the Swallow's Nest, a decorative castle in the Crimea.

Sherwood was educated at the Moscow School of Painting, Sculpture and Architecture (1886–91) and the Imperial Academy of Arts, St Petersburg (1892–1898). He was a pupil of Vladimir Aleksandrovich Beklemishev. He was an exchange student in Paris in 1899–1900, where he became a pupil of Rodin. Returning to Russia, he lived in Petrograd and was employed by Vladimir Lenin for monumental sculpture. He taught sculpture at the Academy of Arts in Petrograd. Among his pupils was Sarra Lebedeva.

Sherwood was awarded the Order of the Red Banner of Labour and was made a Distinguished Artist of the RSFSR.  He died in Leningrad, aged 83.

Sources

This article is translated from Russian Wikipedia

Russian male sculptors
1871 births
1954 deaths
Russian people of English descent
Artists from Moscow
Soviet sculptors
20th-century sculptors
Moscow School of Painting, Sculpture and Architecture alumni
Imperial Academy of Arts alumni